The 105th Technical & Administrative Services Group, known officially as Haribon Group, is one of five TAS units of the 1st Technical and Administrative Services Brigade (Reserve) of the AFP Reserve Command, and is based in Quezon City. The unit provides combat service support services to the 1502nd Infantry Brigade (Ready Reserve) and 1503rd Infantry Brigade (Ready Reserve) of the Army Reserve Command.

The AOR of the 105th TAS Group covers the entirety of Quezon City and the City of Marikina. It is primarily tasked to support maneuver units of the AFP Reserve Force operating within these areas.

The Commissioned Officer Corps
Officers of the 105TASG, AFPRESCOM are directly commissioned through AFP Circular Nr. 4 and 6 and may come from any of the following professions:
 Lawyers and Paralegal Specialists (Judge Advocate General Service)
 Medical Doctors (Medical Corps)
 Nurses (Nurse Corps)
 Dentists (Dental Service)
 Veterinarians (Veterinary Corps)
 Licensed Teachers (Corps of Professors)
 Allied Medical, Business, and Mass Communication Specialists (Medical Administrative Corps)
 Licensed Engineers (Corps of Engineers)
 Ordained Chaplains (Chaplain Service)

Organization
The following are the units that are presently placed under operational control of the 105th Technical & Administrative Services Group (Reserve).

Base Units
   Headquarters & Headquarters Service Support Company

Line Units
   "A" TAS Company
   "B" TAS Company
   "C" TAS Company
   "D" TAS Company

Forward Operating Base Units
   1051st (QUEZON) Technical & Administrative Services Unit (Ready Reserve)
   1052nd (MARIKINA) Technical & Administrative Services Unit (Ready Reserve)

Operations
 Disaster SAR, Relief and Rehabilitation Operations (TF Glenda) (16 Jul 14 - 17 Jul 14)
 Tree Planting CMO Operations (GHQ-AFP) (02 Aug 14 - 06 Sep 14)
 Medical and Dental CMO Operations - Bgy Tatalon, Quezon City (13 Sep 14)
 Tree Planting CMO Operations (San Miguel Corporation Compound) (13 Sep 14)
 Disaster SAR, Relief and Rehabilitation Operations (TF Mario) (19 Sep 14 - 21 Sep 14)
 Tree Planting CMO Operations (Bgy UP Village, Quezon City) (21 Sep 14)
 Security Augmentation Operations (Maginhawa Food Festival) (11 Oct 14)
 Security Augmentation Operations (75th QC Anniversary Float Parade) (12 Oct 14)
 Clean-up CMO Operations (Bgy Tumana, Marikina) (18 Oct 14)
 Medical & Dental Civic Action Program (MEDCAP) (Bgy Kamuning, Quezon City) (08 Feb 15)
 AFP JTF-NCR Contingent 2nd Rescue March Challenge (Manila) (26 Apr 15)
 Brigada Eskwela (ENCAP) (Culiat HS, Quezon City) (18 May 15)
 Medical & Dental Civic Action Program (MEDCAP) (Bgy Olandes, Marikina) (25 Jul 15)
 Medical & Dental Civic Action Program (MEDCAP) (Caloocan HS, Caloocan) (02 Aug 15)
 Medical & Dental Civic Action Program (MEDCAP) (Bgy Nagkaisang Nayon, Quezon City) (05 Sep 15)
 Medical & Dental Civic Action Program (MEDCAP) (Bgy Tatalon, Quezon City) (12 Sep 15)
 AFP-JCI Disaster Responders Challenge (GHQ-AFP) (02 - 03 Dec 16)
 Medical & Dental Civic Action Program (MEDCAP) (Bgy San Mateo, Norzagaray, Bulacan) (30 Dec 16)

Awards and decorations

Campaign streamers

Badges

Gallery

See also
 AFP Reserve Command
 1051st Technical & Administrative Services Unit (Ready Reserve)
 1502nd Infantry Brigade (Ready Reserve)
 201st Infantry Battalion (Ready Reserve)
 202nd Infantry Battalion (Ready Reserve)

References
Citations

Bibliography

 General Orders activating 105TASG of the 1TASBDE, AFPRESCOM.
 AFPRESCOM Official Site
 The AFPRESCOM Training Group, AFP-MOT Manual, 2001, AFPRESCOM.

Battalions of the Philippines
Reserve and Auxiliary Units of the Philippine Military